Aisling Blake, (born 23 July 1981) is a professional squash player who represented Ireland. She reached a career-high world ranking of World No. 22 in November 2010.

References

External links 

Irish female squash players
Living people
1981 births